Concamarise is a comune (municipality) in the Province of Verona in the Italian region Veneto, located about  southwest of Venice and about  southeast of Verona.

The municipality of Concamarise contains the frazione (subdivision) Capitello.

Concamarise borders the following municipalities: Bovolone, Cerea, Salizzole, and Sanguinetto.

Demographic evolution

References

Cities and towns in Veneto